Eugene B. Depew Field is a baseball venue located on the campus of Bucknell University in Lewisburg, Pennsylvania, USA.  It is home to the Bucknell University Bison college baseball team of the Division I Patriot League.  The field has a seating capacity of 500 spectators and was built in 1990.

Naming 
On April 17, 2003, it was dedicated to Bucknell baseball coach Eugene Depew, a Bucknell alumnus (Class of 1971) and coach of the program from 1982–2012.  Depew retired after the 2012 season as the longest serving coach of Bucknell baseball.

Renovations 
In 2009, a FieldTurf surface was installed at the field.  Renovations continued in 2010, when a new backstop, dugouts, and fencing were installed.

See also 
 List of NCAA Division I baseball venues

References 

College baseball venues in the United States
Baseball venues in Pennsylvania
Bucknell Bison baseball
1990 establishments in Pennsylvania
Sports venues completed in 1990